Yojer Enrique Medina (also Yoger Enrique Medina; born 5 September 1973) is a Venezuelan shot putter and discus thrower.

Career

Regional competitions
Medina has been highly successful on the regional level. He won gold medals at the Central American and Caribbean Championships in 1995, 1997, 2001 and 2003. At the Central American and Caribbean Games he won a bronze medal in 1993, gold medals in 1998 and 2002, and finished fourth in 2006. He also won bronze medals in the discus throw in 1993 and 2002. At the South American Championships he won a bronze medal in 1991, and silver medals in 1993, 1995, 2001, 2003 and 2005. He also won a bronze medal in the discus throw in 1993. He is also a multiple Venezuelan national champion.

Global competitions
In world-level competitions, Medina finished twelfth at the 1992 World Junior Championships and sixth at the 1998 IAAF World Cup. He also competed at the World Championships in 1995, 1997 and 2001 as well as the 1996 Olympic Games without reaching the final.

His personal best put is 20.01 metres, achieved in August 2000 in Maracaibo. In the discus throw he has 57.42 metres, achieved in November 1994 in Valencia.

Personal best
Shot put: 20.01 m –  Maracaibo, 26 August 2000
Discus throw: 57.42 m –  Valencia, 22 November 1994
Hammer throw: 60.34 m –  Barquisimeto, 4 April 2003

Achievements

References

External links

 Picture of Yojer Medina

1973 births
Living people
Venezuelan male shot putters
Venezuelan male discus throwers
Athletes (track and field) at the 1996 Summer Olympics
Olympic athletes of Venezuela
Athletes (track and field) at the 1995 Pan American Games
Athletes (track and field) at the 1999 Pan American Games
Athletes (track and field) at the 2003 Pan American Games
South American Games silver medalists for Venezuela
South American Games medalists in athletics
Central American and Caribbean Games gold medalists for Venezuela
Competitors at the 1994 South American Games
Competitors at the 1993 Central American and Caribbean Games
Competitors at the 1998 Central American and Caribbean Games
Competitors at the 2002 Central American and Caribbean Games
Competitors at the 2006 Central American and Caribbean Games
Competitors at the 2010 Central American and Caribbean Games
Central American and Caribbean Games medalists in athletics
Pan American Games competitors for Venezuela
20th-century Venezuelan people
21st-century Venezuelan people